Robert Edward Dietz (December 4, 1917 – May 4, 1999) was an American professional basketball player. He played in the National Basketball League for the Indianapolis Kautskys for four seasons and averaged 4.6 points per game for his career. He served as a player-coach during the 1946–47 season.

Dietz served in the Navy during World War II. Aside from his playing career, he also coached Butler University's men's basketball and tennis teams, serving as an assistant in basketball and the head coach for tennis.

References

1917 births
1999 deaths
American men's basketball players
United States Navy personnel of World War II
Basketball coaches from Indiana
Basketball players from Indianapolis
Butler Bulldogs men's basketball coaches
Butler Bulldogs men's basketball players
College tennis coaches in the United States
Forwards (basketball)
Guards (basketball)
Indianapolis Kautskys coaches
Indianapolis Kautskys players
Military personnel from Indiana
Player-coaches